Clay Central–Everly Community School District (CCE) is a school district headquartered in Royal, Iowa, United States. The district is mostly in Clay County, with portions in Dickinson and O'Brien counties. It serves Royal, Everly, Greenville, and Rossie.

History
The district was formed on July 1, 1993, by the merger of the Clay Central School District and the Everly School District.

On July 1, 2010, the South Clay Community School District was dissolved, and portions went to the Clay Central–Everly district.

On March 12, 2019, the school board decided to tuition out the middle/high school. The students had a choice of four schools: Okoboji, Sioux Central, Spencer, and Hartley–Melvin–Sanborn. The last school day was June 3, 2019.

References

External links
 

School districts in Iowa
Education in Clay County, Iowa
Education in Dickinson County, Iowa
Education in O'Brien County, Iowa
1993 establishments in Iowa
School districts established in 1993